Alex Graham may refer to:

 Alex Graham (footballer) (1889–1972), Scottish footballer
 Alex Graham (producer) (born 1953), journalist and British independent television producer
 Alex Graham (cartoonist) (1913–1991), British cartoonist

See also 
 Alec Graham (1929–2021), English Anglican bishop